Argentina v England was a football match played on 22 June 1986 between Argentina and England in the quarter-finals of the 1986 FIFA World Cup at the Estadio Azteca in Mexico City. The game was held four years after the Falklands War between Argentina and the United Kingdom, and was a key part in the already intense Argentina–England football rivalry. It was also a match which included two of the most well-known goals in football history, both scored by Argentina captain Diego Maradona.

The first goal, after 51 minutes, was the "Hand of God goal," which Maradona scored by using his hand. The second, four minutes after his first, saw him dribble past five England players, Peter Beardsley, Peter Reid, Terry Butcher, Terry Fenwick, Butcher (again), and finally goalkeeper Peter Shilton, and became known as the "Goal of the Century." Argentina won the game 2–1 and went on to win the 1986 World Cup with a victory over West Germany in the final match. Maradona won the golden ball for player of the tournament; England's goalscorer on the day, Gary Lineker, won the golden boot for being the tournament's top scorer.

Background

Argentina–England football rivalry

The rivalry between the England and Argentina national football teams is generally traced back to the 1966 FIFA World Cup. During the quarter-final game at Wembley Stadium, the home of the England national team, Argentine captain Antonio Rattin was sent off as Argentina lost in a game which contained excessive foul play. Rattin was angered at the sending-off, feeling that the German referee Rudolf Kreitlein, who did not speak Spanish, had been biased towards the English, a fellow European nation, in front of their home fans, and stamped over the royal carpet in the stadium. This led England manager Alf Ramsey to describe the Argentines as "animals", comments that were viewed as racist by the Argentines.

Despite the popularity of Osvaldo Ardiles and Ricardo Villa, Argentines who played with Tottenham Hotspur in England in an era before it was commonplace for clubs to have non-British players, the rivalry remained strong.

Falklands War
Outside football, the Falklands War in 1982 increased the mistrust between England and Argentina. Britain administrates the Falkland Islands, a small archipelago in the South Atlantic, as a British overseas territory; Argentina claims the islands as Islas Malvinas. On 2 April 1982, Argentina's forces invaded the islands. Britain considered this an invasion of its territory and sent a naval task force that recaptured the Islands on 15 June 1982. Though the two nations were never officially at war, the conflict resulted in 285 British and 659 Argentine deaths. As a result, the match taking place four years after the war was emotionally charged. Following the game, Maradona stated: "Although we had said before the game that football had nothing to do with the Malvinas war, we knew they had killed a lot of Argentine boys there, killed them like little birds. And this was revenge."

1986 FIFA World Cup

The 1986 FIFA World Cup was held in Mexico after the original hosts, Colombia, were unable to host the tournament. England qualified for the finals undefeated, topping Group 3 in the UEFA zone; Argentina also topped their qualifying group in CONMEBOL. In the early stages of the tournament, Argentina had been comfortable, winning two and drawing one in the group stage. England had qualified more narrowly, with a 3–0 win over Poland in the final match putting them into the round of 16. Both teams won comfortably against South American opposition in that round, Argentina against Uruguay and England against Paraguay. Although neither team began the tournaments as favourites, England's form had been improving throughout the World Cup and Argentina were buoyed by the skill of Maradona.

Argentina kit change

Argentina beat Uruguay 1–0 in the round of 16 wearing blue cotton shirts that coach Carlos Bilardo believed would prove too uncomfortable in the searing Mexico City heat. Bilardo asked Argentina's kit manufacturer to come up with lighter blue shirts for the quarter-final, an impossible request given the short deadline. With three days to go before the match, he sent out Ruben Moschella, a member of his coaching staff, to scour the shops of the Mexican capital for a suitable kit. He returned with two different blue shirts, which they subsequently weighed but were unable to choose between. It was then that Diego Maradona appeared and said: "That’s a nice jersey. We’ll beat England in that." Moschella returned to the shop and bought 38 of the shirts for the side to wear against England. A designer fashioned some makeshift Argentine Football Association (AFA) badges, which were then sewn on to each jersey opposite the logo of Le Coq Sportif, which provided kits for Argentina at the time, with silvery American football shirt numbers hurriedly ironed on to the backs.

Previous incidents
Before the 1986 game fans from both countries had a fight in Mexico City streets and into the stadium too. As a result, several English fans were hospitalised while some of their flags were stolen by Argentine barrabravas. Those flags would be then exhibited by Boca Juniors's supporters during some Argentine league matches.

Match

First half
The game started with both teams exchanging chances. Argentina began to dominate, with England's goalkeeper Peter Shilton saving several good chances, many created by Maradona. Peter Beardsley had England's best chance after 13 minutes, following a slip from Nery Pumpido in Argentina's goal, but failed to take it. At half time, the score was 00, Argentina having had much more of the possession and territory – and done a great deal more of the running – but having failed to get through England's defence.

Second half
It was the second half of the match that was to see the two incidents for which the game was to become both famous and infamous.

The "Hand of God"

Six minutes into the second half, Maradona cut inside from the left and played a diagonal low pass to the edge of the area to teammate Jorge Valdano and continued his run in the hope of a one-two movement. Maradona's pass was played slightly behind Valdano and reached England's Steve Hodge, the left midfielder who had dropped back to defend.

Hodge tried to hook the ball clear but miscued it. The ball looped off his foot and into the penalty area, toward Maradona, who had continued his run. England goalkeeper Peter Shilton came out of his goal to punch the ball clear. Maradona, despite being 8 inches (20 cm) shorter than the 6-foot-1 (1.85 m) Shilton, reached it first with his outside left hand. The ball bounced into the goal. Referee Ali Bin Nasser of Tunisia said he did not see the infringement and allowed the goal.

Maradona later said, "I was waiting for my teammates to embrace me, and no one came... I told them, 'Come hug me, or the referee isn't going to allow it.'"

At the post-game press conference, Maradona facetiously commented that the goal was scored "un poco con la cabeza de Maradona y otro poco con la mano de Dios" ("a little with the head of Maradona and a little with the hand of God"), after which it became known as the "Hand of God" goal. The goal helped intensify the footballing rivalry between the two nations. Cesar Luis Menotti said, "People said, 'Great! Better, much better, that the goal was so unjust, so cruel, because it hurt the English more.'" In the 2019 documentary film directed by Asif Kapadia, Maradona linked the event to the Falklands War: "We, as Argentinians, didn't know what the military was up to. They told us that we were winning the war. But in reality, England was winning. It was tough. The hype made it seem like we were going to play out another war. I knew it was my hand. It wasn't my plan but the action happened so fast that the linesman didn't see me putting my hand in. The referee looked at me and he said: 'Goal.' It was a nice feeling like some sort of symbolic revenge against the English."

The Goal of the Century

Four minutes after the Hand of God goal came a 2nd goal as the ball was passed to Maradona inside his own half. Maradona then began his 60-yard, 10-second dash towards the English goal, passing four English outfield players: Peter Beardsley, Peter Reid, Terry Butcher (twice) and Terry Fenwick. Maradona finished the move with a feint that left goalkeeper Peter Shilton on his bottom, before slotting the ball into the empty net to make the score 2–0 to Argentina.

About the goal, Maradona said to reporters, "I made the play to give it to Valdano, but when I got to the area they surrounded me and I had no space. Therefore, I had to continue the play and finish it myself." He later complimented the fair play of the English team, saying, "I don't think I could have done it against any other team because they all used to knock you down; they are probably the noblest in the world".

In 2002, the goal was voted 'Goal of the Century' as part of the buildup to the 2002 FIFA World Cup tournament on the FIFA website. It beat a goal scored by England's Michael Owen against Argentina in the 1998 FIFA World Cup, which came second, whilst another 1986 FIFA World Cup goal by Maradona, from the semi-final match against Belgium, came fourth.

In Spanish-speaking countries, this goal is usually associated with the passionate live commentary by Uruguayan journalist Víctor Hugo Morales (translation from Spanish):

Lineker's goal and Argentine victory
Argentina's 2-0 lead forced England into a double-attacking substitution, bringing on Barnes and Waddle, and it nearly paid off: as the Argentine team began to tire after their earlier efforts, England began to push further up the pitch, looking to get back into the game. Driven by Glenn Hoddle and John Barnes, they created chances, and Gary Lineker scored his sixth goal of the tournament in the 81st minute from a Barnes cross. Argentina had further chances as well, with Carlos Tapia hitting the inside of the post immediately after England's goal. England were unable to score an equaliser and Argentina won the match 2–1.

Details

Aftermath and legacy
Hodge swapped shirts with Maradona after the game; Hodge lent out the Argentine's jersey to the National Football Museum in the 2000s. The game added hugely to the rivalry between the two teams. In Argentina, the game was seen as revenge for the Falklands War and for what they still see as the unfair game in the 1966 World Cup. The former Argentine international Roberto Perfumo stated that "In 1986, winning that game against England was enough. Winning the World Cup was secondary for us. Beating England was our real aim".

The majesty of Maradona's second goal, the solo run from midfield, and the notoriety of his first, the "hand of God", saw the French newspaper L'Équipe describe him as "half-angel, half-devil". Although the first goal proved highly controversial in England, Maradona's second goal was nevertheless recognized all over the world for its brilliance. A notable example of the English appreciation of his genius occurred in a 2002 poll conducted by Channel 4, where the UK public voted Maradona's performance sixth in the list of the 100 Greatest Sporting Moments. Outside the Estadio Azteca a statue of Maradona scoring the goal was erected to commemorate the moment.

Argentina went on to win the 1986 FIFA World Cup by defeating West Germany in the final match, as well as finishing runners-up in the 1990 FIFA World Cup. England's Lineker won the Golden Boot for being top scorer in the 1986 FIFA World Cup. With a similar squad, England finished fourth in the 1990 FIFA World Cup, their highest finish since 1966.

The two teams have since met twice in World Cup matches. Argentina won a round-of-16 match in the shootout at the 1998 FIFA World Cup, after one penalty kick was awarded to each side, David Beckham was sent off, Sol Campbell had a goal disallowed and Michael Owen scored his famous goal. At the 2002 FIFA World Cup, the teams met in the group stage, and the match, which began at 12:30 PM UK time, was described as the "longest lunch break in history" as millions in England stopped their jobs and activities to watch the game on TV. England won 1–0 courtesy of a foul by Mauricio Pochettino on Michael Owen. Beckham's penalty kick won the match for England and Argentina later failed to advance to the knockout round.

On 17 August 2015, Maradona visited Ali Bin Nasser, the referee of the 1986 World Cup quarter-final, at his home in Tunisia, and paid tribute to him by giving him an Argentine jersey bearing his signature, and referred to him as "my eternal friend".

In April 2022, it was announced that the shirt worn by Maradona in that match would be auctioned by multinational company Sotheby's. The shirt was property of England's Steve Hodge, who exchanged shirts with Maradona at the end of the match. Hodge kept the piece for over 16 years until he lent it to the National Football Museum in Manchester to be exhibited there. The shirt was estimated to sell for more than £4 million (US$5.25  million).

On 4 May, the shirt was sold for £7,142,500 (US$9.2 million), according to Sothebys' sources. The price fetched a new record for an item of sports memorabilia.

References

External links

 Article of the match on The Guardian. 26 April 2020
 Maradona's Goal in AR on The Straits Times. 17 November 2022

1986 FIFA World Cup
Eng
FIFA World Cup matches
1986
1986
FIFA World Cup controversies
England at the 1986 FIFA World Cup
1986 controversies
Football in Mexico City
Diego Maradona
1980s in Mexico City
Sports competitions in Mexico City
Politics and sports
June 1986 sports events in North America